The jeweled chameleon (Furcifer campani), also commonly known as Campan's chameleon or the Madagascar forest chameleon, is a species of lizard in the family Chamaeleonidae. The species is endemic to the central highlands of Madagascar, where it is threatened by bush fires and habitat loss.

Etymology
The specific name, campani, is in honor of Dominique Campan, a French resident of Madagascar.

Description
The background colour varies from pale green through dark green to brown. There are three pale brown, lateral stripes running along each side of the body and numerous small bright-coloured spots between them. The head is often decorated with small red spots. This chameleon has a crest running along its back composed of small projecting granules.

Distribution and habitat
However, only part of this is suitable habitat, and its population is fragmented. It is a terrestrial species and its habitat is mountain grass and heathland with shrubs and isolated trees.

Behaviour and diet
Chameleons are ambush predators, standing still and waiting for suitable prey to come within reach. The diet of a chameleon consists largely of insects which it catches by shooting out its long tongue which has a sticky tip.

Reproduction
Reproduction in F. campani takes place two or three times a year. Clutches of eight to twelve eggs are laid in concealed locations. The young grow fast and are sexually mature at three months. Some reports say that this chameleon hibernates, burying itself in leaves during the winter months.

Conservation status
In some areas of shrubby savannah grassland F. campani is reported to be common, but no real assessment of its abundance has been made. The IUCN Red List of Threatened Species lists it as being "Vulnerable". This is because its habitat is being cleared for agricultural production, and there is an annual cycle of burning. It shares its range with the white-lined chameleon (F. lateralis), and that species seems better able to cope with the disturbance and degradation to the habitat caused by humans. It should be safe from human disturbance in the national park, but this is not the case on the Ankaratra mountains. Exports of F. campani peaked in 1994 when over five thousand were removed from the island. Although the export of all chameleons from Madagascar has been banned since then, some may still be being collected. The IUCN consider that steps should be taken to limit the damage done by fires to the grassland where F. campani is found.

References

Further reading
Glaw F, Vences M (1994). A Fieldguide to the Amphibians and Reptiles of Madagascar, Second Edition. Cologne, Germany: Vences & Glaw Verlag / Serpents Tale. 480 pp. . (Furcifer campani, p. 254).
Grandidier A (1872). "Descriptions de quelques Reptiles nouveaux découverts à Madagascar en 1870 ". Annales des Sciences Naturelles, Zoologie et Paléontologie, Cinquième Série 15 (20): 6–22. ("Chamæleo Campani [sic]", new species, p. 8). (in French).
Schmidt, Wofgang (1992). "Über die erstmals gelungene Nachzucht von Furcifer campani (Grandidier, 1872), sowie eine Zusammenstellung einiger Ei - Zeitigungsdaten von verschiedenen Chamäleon - Arten in Tabellenform ". Sauria 14 (3): 21–23. (in German).

Furcifer
chameleon
chameleon
Reptiles described in 1872
Taxa named by Alfred Grandidier
Taxonomy articles created by Polbot